Selivyorstovo is a rural locality (a selo) and the administrative center of Selivyorstovsky Selsoviet of Volchikhinsky District, Altai Krai, Russia. The population was 659 as of 2016. It was founded in 1800. There are 8 streets.

Geography 
Selivyorstovo is located 56 km northeast of Volchikha (the district's administrative centre) by road. Vesyolaya Dubrava is the nearest rural locality.

Ethnicity 
The village is inhabited by Russians and others.

References 

Rural localities in Volchikhinsky District